The 2011–12 season will be Újpest FC's 106th competitive season, 100th consecutive season in the OTP Bank Liga and 126th year in existence as a football club.

First team squad

Transfers

Summer

In:

Out:

Winter

In:

Out:

List of Hungarian football transfer summer 2011
List of Hungarian football transfers winter 2011–12

Statistics

Appearances and goals
Last updated on 27 May 2012.

|-
|colspan="14"|Youth players

|-
|colspan="14"|Players currently out on loan

|-
|colspan="14"|Players no longer at the club:

|}

Top scorers
Includes all competitive matches. The list is sorted by shirt number when total goals are equal.

Last updated on 27 May 2012

Disciplinary record
Includes all competitive matches. Players with 1 card or more included only.

Last updated on 27 May 2012

Overall
{|class="wikitable"
|-
|Games played || 44 (30 OTP Bank Liga, 8 Hungarian Cup and 6 Hungarian League Cup)
|-
|Games won || 14 (8 OTP Bank Liga, 3 Hungarian Cup and 3 Hungarian League Cup)
|-
|Games drawn || 11 (8 OTP Bank Liga, 2 Hungarian Cup and 1 Hungarian League Cup)
|-
|Games lost || 19 (14 OTP Bank Liga, 3 Hungarian Cup and 2 Hungarian League Cup)
|-
|Goals scored || 70
|-
|Goals conceded || 73
|-
|Goal difference || -3
|-
|Yellow cards || 89
|-
|Red cards || 9
|-
||Worst discipline ||  Péter Rajczi (8 , 4 )
|-
|rowspan="1"|Best result || 4–0 (H) v Bajai LSE - Hungarian Cup - 13-03-2012
|-
|rowspan="1"|Worst result || 1–5 (H) v Debreceni VSC - OTP Bank Liga - 01-04-2012
|-
|rowspan="1"|Most appearances ||  Szabolcs Balajcza (38 appearances)
|-
|rowspan="2"|Top scorer ||  Péter Kabát (12 goals)
|-
|  Péter Rajczi (12 goals)
|-
|Points || 55/133 (41.35%)
|-

Nemzeti Bajnokság I

Matches

Classification

Results summary

Results by round

Hungarian Cup

Round of 16

Quarter-final

Semi-final

League Cup

Matches

Classification

Pre Season (Winter)

References

External links
 Eufo
 Official Website
 UEFA
 fixtures and results

Újpest FC seasons
Ujpest